Hassall Hall is a former manor house to the east of the village of Hassall, Cheshire, England. The house dates from the 17th century, and was re-fronted in the 19th century.  It has since been divided into two houses.  It is constructed in rendered brick and has a slate roof.  The house has an H-plan.  The entrance front is symmetrical, in two storeys, with five bays.  The central three bays are recessed and the middle bay contains a doorway.  The doorway is flanked by Tuscan pillars, and above the door is an open pediment enclosing a fanlight.  The houses are recorded in the National Heritage List for England as a designated Grade II* listed building.

See also

Grade II* listed buildings in Cheshire East
Listed buildings in Hassall

References

Houses completed in the 19th century
Country houses in Cheshire
Grade II* listed buildings in Cheshire
Grade II* listed houses